This is a list of episodes from the ninth season of Happy Days.

Main cast
 Henry Winkler as Arthur "Fonzie" Fonzarelli
 Marion Ross as Marion Cunningham
 Anson Williams as Warren "Potsie" Weber
 Erin Moran as Joanie Cunningham
 Al Molinaro as Alfred "Al" Delvecchio
 Scott Baio as Chachi Arcola
 Lynda Goodfriend as Lori Beth Allen Cunningham
 Tom Bosley as Howard Cunningham

Guest stars
 Cathy Silvers as Jenny Piccalo
 Ted McGinley as Roger Phillips 
 Ellen Travolta as Louisa Arcola 
 Billy Warlock as Flip Phillips
Denis Mandel as Eugene Belvin
Scott Berenstein as Melvin Belvin
Harris Kal as Bobby
Kevin Sullivan as Tommy
 Ed Peck as Officer Kirk

Broadcast history
The season aired Tuesdays at 8:00-8:30 pm (EST).

Episodes

Consisted of 22 episodes airing on ABC.
Recurring Character Debuts: Lori Beth Allen Cunningham (Lynda Goodfriend).
This is the last season to feature Al Molinaro, Erin Moran and Scott Baio as Al Devecchio, Joanie Cunningham and Chachi Arcola respectively before leaving the show to star in a short-lived spinoff called Joanie Loves Chachi.

References

Happy Days 09
1981 American television seasons
1982 American television seasons